John Cassisi (born September 5, 1962) is a former American child actor who starred in the 1976 movie Bugsy Malone as "Fat Sam" and subsequently in the television series Fish.

Biography 
He was "discovered" by Bugsy Malone director Alan Parker, when Parker visited a Brooklyn classroom and asked  students to nominate the "naughtiest" boy in class.

In 1982, he played the role of Herschel in the broad-way film "Gemini" alongside former Bugsy Malone star Scott Baio.

After retiring from acting in 1982, Cassisi became involved in construction work. From 2012 to 2014, he served as the Director of Global Construction for Citigroup. In 2015, he pled guilty to a bribery scheme and was sentenced to two to six years in prison plus a $500,000 forfeiture.

Cassisi is married and has had three children. His eldest son, Robert, died after suffering from a pulmonary embolism at the age of 26.

Partial filmography

References

External links
 

American male television actors
American male child actors
1962 births
Living people
Criminals from New York City
Citigroup employees